Petr Altrichter (born May 24, 1951 in Frenštát pod Radhoštěm, Czechoslovakia) is a Czech conductor. He studied French horn and conducting at the Conservatory of Music in Ostrava. He also studied at the Janáček Academy of Music and Performing Arts. He worked as an assistant conductor to Václav Neumann at the Czech Philharmonic Orchestra.

With the Prague Symphony Orchestra, Altrichter served as its principal guest conductor, and later principal conductor from 1990 to 1992. In Germany, he was Music Director of the Südwestdeutsche Philharmonie from 1993 to 2004. In the UK, he was principal conductor of the Royal Liverpool Philharmonic Orchestra (RLPO) from 1997 to 2001. His RLPO tenure was marked by financial troubles which had begun before his tenure, in addition to criticism of his conducting style.

Since 2002, Altrichter is the principal conductor of the Brno Philharmonic Orchestra.

References

External links
 Petr Altrichter biography from agent's website
 IMG Artists biography of Altrichter

1951 births
Living people
Czech conductors (music)
Male conductors (music)
Janáček Academy of Music and Performing Arts alumni
21st-century conductors (music)
21st-century Czech male musicians